Sean Llewellyn Williams (born 23 May 1967) is an Australian author of science fiction who lives in Adelaide, South Australia. Several of his books have been New York Times best-sellers.

Early life and education
Williams was born in Whyalla, South Australia on 23 May 1967.

He studied sciences and music at Pulteney Grammar School and matriculated third in his year (1984), topping the state for Musical composition.  That same year, he won the Young Composer's Award for a theme and three variations for string quartet with flute, oboe and trumpet soloists called "Release of Anger".

He then went to Adelaide University and studied a Bachelor of Economics and wrote for the student newspaper On Dit.  He completed a Master of Arts in Creative Writing at Adelaide University in 2005 and was in 2010 a PhD candidate at the same institution.

Writing career
He is the author of over eighty published short stories and thirty-nine novels, including Twinmaker and (with Garth Nix) the Troubletwisters series. He has co-written three books in the Star Wars: New Jedi Order series.  His novelisation of Star Wars: The Force Unleashed was the first novelisation of a computer game to debut at #1 on the "New York Times" bestseller list.

Other roles
Williams was Chair of the SA Writers' Centre from 2001 to 2003, and is one of only three lifetime members of that institution.  Williams has also tutored for the Clarion South Workshop, was a previous winner of the Writers of the Future contest, and is now a judge for the same.

Awards
Williams is a multiple recipient of both the Ditmar and Aurealis Awards.

Novels

Evergence (with Shane Dix)
The Prodigal Sun (1999)
The Dying Light (2000) - Winner, Best Long Fiction, 2001 Ditmar Award
The Dark Imbalance (2001) - Winner, Best Science Fiction Novel, 2001 Aurealis Award

The Books of the Change
The Stone Mage & the Sea (2001)
The Sky Warden & the Sun (2002)
The Storm Weaver & the Sand (2002) - Winner, Best Fantasy Novel, 2002 Aurealis Award

Orphans (with Shane Dix)
Echoes of Earth (2002) - Winner, Best Australian Novel, 2002 Ditmar Award
Orphans of Earth (2003)
Heirs of Earth (2004)

Star Wars: New Jedi Order (with Shane Dix)
Force Heretic I: Remnant (2003)
Force Heretic II: Refugee (2003)
Force Heretic III: Reunion (2003)

Star Wars
The Force Unleashed (2008)
Star Wars: The Old Republic: Fatal Alliance (2010)
The Force Unleashed II (2010)

The Books of the Cataclysm
The Crooked Letter (2004) - Winner, Best Novel, 2004 Ditmar Award & Winner, Best Fantasy Novel, 2004 Aurealis Award
The Blood Debt (2005)
The Hanging Mountains (2005)
The Devoured Earth (2006)

Geodesica (with Shane Dix)
Ascent (2005) - Winner, Best Novel, 2005 Ditmar Award
Descent (2006)

The Broken Land
 The Changeling (2008) - Shortlisted for Best Young Adult Novel, and Best Children's Novel, in the 2008 Aurealis Award.
 The Dust Devils (2008) - Shortlisted for the Best Children's Novel, in the 2008 Aurealis Award.
 The Scarecrow (2009)

Astropolis
 Saturn Returns (2007) - Winner, Best Novel, 2008 Ditmar Award
 Cenotaxis (2007) - book 1.5, novella
 Earth Ascendant (2008)
 The Grand Conjunction (2009)

The Fixers
 Castle of the Zombies (2010)
 Planet of the Cyborgs (2010)
 Last of the Vampires (2010)
 Invasion of the Weird  (2010)

Troubletwisters series (with Garth Nix)
 The Magic (2011) (aka Troubletwisters in Australia)
 The Monster (2012)
 The Mystery (2013) (aka Mystery of the Golden Card in Australia)
 The Missing (2014) (aka Missing, Presumed Evil in Australia and the UK)

Twinmaker Series
 Twinmaker: Jump (2013) (aka Twinmaker  outside of Australia)
 Twinmaker: Crash (2014) (aka Crashland outside of Australia)
 Twinmaker: Fall (2015) (aka Hollowgirl outside of Australia)

Others
The Unknown Soldier: Book One of the Cogal (1995) - (with Shane Dix) Re-imagined and rewritten as The Prodigal Sun
Metal Fatigue (1996) - Winner, Best Science Fiction Novel, 1996 Aurealis Award
The Resurrected Man (1998) - Winner, Best Long Fiction, 1999 Ditmar Award
 Spirit Animals Book 3: Blood Ties (2014) (with Garth Nix)
Impossible Music (2019)
Her Perilous Mansion (2021) - Shortlisted, 2021 Patricia Wrightson Prize for Children’s Literature

Collections
 Doorways to Eternity (MirrorDanse Books, 1994)
 A View Before Dying (Ticonderoga Publications, 1998)
 New Adventures in Sci-Fi (Ticonderoga Publications, 1999) - Winner, Best Collected Work, 2000 Ditmar Award
 Light Bodies Falling (Altair Australia, 2007)
 Magic Dirt: The Best of Sean Williams (Ticonderoga Publications, 2008) - Winner, Best Collection, 2008 Aurealis Award

Notable short stories
"The Freezing of Sarah" (1997) in Bloodsongs #9
"Entre les Beaux Morts en Vie (Among the Beautiful Living Dead)" (1998) in Dreaming Down-Under (ed. Jack Dann, Janeen Webb)
"Hunting Ground" (2003) in Southern Blood: New Australian Tales of the Supernatural (ed. Bill Congreve)
"haikaiju" (2005) in Daikaiju! Giant Monster Tales (ed. Robert Hood, Robin Pen)
"daihaiku" (2005) in Daikaiju! Giant Monster Tales (ed. Robert Hood, Robin Pen)
 "The Tyranny of Distance" (2014) in SQ Mag, Edition 14 (ed. Sophie Yorkston)
 "The Legend Trap" (2014) in Kaleidoscope (Twelfth Planet Press) - Winner, Best Novella or Novelette, 2015 Ditmar Award
 Ghosts of the Fall
 White Christmas
 The Jackie Onassis Swamp-Buggy Concerto
 The Soap Bubble
 The Perfect Gun
 The Masque of Agamemnon (with Simon Brown)
 The Girl-Thing
 Star Wars: Or Die Trying (with Shane Dix)
 The Seventh Letter
 Midnight in the Cafe of the Black Madonna (Doctor Who)

References

External links
Personal Website
Blog
Interview with Sean Williams at Neth Space
Interview with Sean Williams at SFFWorld.com
Interview by Tobias Buckell for Clarkesworld Magazine
South Australian Writers Centre
Interview 1 with www.theforce.net
Interview 2 with www.theforce.net
 

1967 births
Living people
Australian fantasy writers
Australian atheists
Australian science fiction writers
Australian male novelists
People from Whyalla
Writers from Adelaide
University of Adelaide alumni